This is a list of the amphibian species recorded in Ghana. There are 80 amphibian species in Ghana, of which 2 are critically endangered, 6 are endangered, 4 are vulnerable and 10 are near-threatened. This list is derived from the Amphibiaweb Database & IUCN Redlist which lists species of amphibians and includes those amphibians that have recently been classified as extinct (since 1500 AD). The taxonomy and naming of the individual species is based on those currently used by the Amphibiaweb Database & IUCN Redlist as of 23 September 2011 and supplemented by the Common Names and taxonomy from the IUCN & Wikipedia where no Amphibiaweb article was available.

The following tags are used to highlight specific species' conservation status as assessed by the IUCN:

Order: Anura (Frogs & Toads)

Sub-order: Mesobatrachia
Family: Pipidae
Genus: Xenopus
 Muller's Platanna Xenopus muelleri LC
 Tropical Clawed Frog Xenopus tropicalis LC
Sub-order: Neobatrachia
Family: Arthroleptidae
Genus: Arthroleptis
 Arthroleptis krokosua EN
 Mottled Squeaker Arthroleptis poecilonotus LC
 Buea Screeching Frog Arthroleptis variabilis LC
 Zimmer's Screeching Frog Arthroleptis zimmeri DD
Genus: Cardioglossa
 Silver Long-fingered Frog Cardioglossa leucomystax LC
 Cardioglossa occidentalis LC
Genus: Leptopelis
 Savannah Forest Treefrog Leptopelis bufonides LC
 Amani Forest Tree Frog Leptopelis macrotis NT
 Tai Forest Treefrog Leptopelis occidentalis NT
 Leptopelis spiritusnoctis LC
 Rusty Forest Treefrog Leptopelis viridis LC
Family: Bufonidae
Genus: Amietophrynus
 Flat-backed Toad Amietophrynus maculatus LC
 Common African Toad Amietophrynus regularis LC
 African Giant Toad Amietophrynus superciliaris LC
 Togo Toad Amietophrynus togoensis NT
Genus: Bufo
 Penton's Toad Bufo pentoni LC
Family: Hemisotidae
Genus: Hemisus
 Guinea Shovelnose Frog Hemisus guineensis LC
 Marbled Shovelnose Frog Hemisus marmoratus LC
Family: Hyperoliidae
Genus: Acanthixalus
 African Wart Frog Acanthixalus sonjae NT
Genus: Afrixalus
 Brown Banana Frog Afrixalus dorsalis LC
 Banded Banana Frog Afrixalus fulvovittatus LC
 Nigerian Banana Frog Afrixalus nigeriensis NT
 Afrixalus vibekensis NT
 Savanna Banana Frog Afrixalus vittiger LC
 Weidholz's Banana Frog Afrixalus weidholzi LC
Genus: Hyperolius
 Baumann's Reed Frog Hyperolius baumanni LC
 Bobiri Reed Frog Hyperolius bobirensis EN
 Hyperolius concolor LC
 Lime Reed Frog Hyperolius fusciventris LC
 Dotted Reed Frog Hyperolius guttulatus LC
 Hyperolius igbettensis LC
 Schiotz's Reed Frog Hyperolius laurenti VU
 Hyperolius nitidulus LC
 Hyperolius picturatus LC
 Hyperolius sylvaticus LC
 Ukami Reed Frog Hyperolius torrentis EN
 Stream Reed Frog Hyperolius viridigulosus VU
Genus: Kassina
 Ivory Coast Running Frog Kassina arboricola VU
 Silver Running Frog Kassina cassinoides LC
 Cochran's Running Frog Kassina cochranae NT
 Brown Running Frog Kassina fusca LC
 Senegal Running Frog Kassina senegalensis LC
Genus: Phlyctimantis
 Phlyctimantis boulengeri LC
Family: Microhylidae
Genus: Phrynomantis
 West African Rubber Frog Phrynomantis microps LC
Family: Ranidae
Genus: Hylarana
 Hylarana albolabris LC
 Galam White-lipped Frog Hylarana galamensis LC
 Ivory Coast Frog Hylarana occidentalis EN
Genus: Aubria
 Aubria occidentalis LC
Genus: Chiromantis
 African Foam Nest Frog Chiromantis rufescens LC
Genus: Conraua
 Togo Slippery Frog Conraua derooi CR
Genus: Hildebrandtia
 Ornate Frog Hildebrandtia ornata LC
Genus: Hoplobatrachus
 Crowned Bullfrog Hoplobatrachus occipitalis LC
Genus: Phrynobatrachus
 Phrynobatrachus albolabris DD
 Allen's River Frog Phrynobatrachus alleni NT
 Ringed River Frog Phrynobatrachus annulatus EN
 Boutry River Frog Phrynobatrachus calcaratus LC
 Phrynobatrachus francisci LC
 Ghana River Frog Phrynobatrachus ghanensis EN
 Chabanaud's River Frog Phrynobatrachus gutturosus LC
 Phrynobatrachus intermedius CR
 Ahl's River Frog Phrynobatrachus latifrons LC
 Phrynobatrachus liberiensis NT
 Natal Puddle Frog Phrynobatrachus natalensis LC
 Coast River Frog Phrynobatrachus plicatus LC
 Phrynobatrachus tokba LC
 Yapo River Frog Phrynobatrachus villiersi VU
 Phrynobatrachus vogti DD
Genus: Ptychadena
 Victoria Grassland Frog Ptychadena aequiplicata LC
 Broad-banded Grassland Frog Ptychadena bibroni LC
 Ptychadena longirostris LC
 Mascarene Ridged Frog Ptychadena mascareniensis LC
 Sharp-nosed Ridged FrogPtychadena oxyrhynchus LC
 Schilluk Ridged Frog Ptychadena schillukorum LC
 Uganda Grassland Frog Ptychadena stenocephala LC
 Ptychadena superciliaris NT
 Central Grassland Frog Ptychadena tellinii LC
 Dakar Grassland Frog Ptychadena trinodis LC

Order: Gymnophiona (Caecilian)

Family: Dermophiidae (Caecilian)
Genus: Geotrypetes
 Geotrypetes seraphini LC

See also
List of chordate orders
Lists of amphibians by region

References

Amphibians
Ghana
 
Ghana